Cargill MacMillan Sr. (October 10, 1900 - October 16, 1968) was an American business executive, serving as the President of Cargill in Minneapolis.

Early life
MacMillan was born on October 10, 1900. He was the second son of John H. MacMillan Sr. and Edna Clara Cargill.

Career
MacMillan served as the President of Cargill.

Personal life
He married Pauline Whitney (1900–1990), and they had four children. Each of the three surviving adult children received a one-ninth share of Cargill.
 Cargill MacMillan Jr. (1927–2011)
 Whitney MacMillan (1929-2020)
 Alice Whitney MacMillan (1932–1932)
 Pauline MacMillan Keinath (born 1934)

Death
MacMillan died on October 16, 1968.

References

1900 births
1968 deaths
American business executives
Cargill people
20th-century American businesspeople